Travel Channel (stylized as Trvl Channel since 2018) is an American pay television channel owned by Warner Bros. Discovery, which had previously owned the channel from 1997 to 2007. The channel is headquartered in New York, New York, United States with offices in Silver Spring, Maryland and Knoxville, Tennessee.

It features documentaries, reality, and how-to shows related to travel and leisure around the United States and throughout the world. Programming has included shows on African animal safaris, tours of grand hotels and resorts, visits to significant cities and towns around the world, programming about various foods around the world, and programming about ghosts and the paranormal in notable buildings.

As of February 2015, Travel Channel is available to approximately 91.5 million households (comprising 78.6% of households with television) in the United States.

History

The Travel Channel was launched on February 1, 1987; it was founded by TWA Marketing Services (a subsidiary of Trans World Airlines), presumably to boost airline patronage. The channel's name was derived from the travel-related filler programming that aired between programs on the Home Theater Network. TWA purchased the name rights from Group W Satellite Communications in 1986, and took over HTN's transponder spot following the shutdown of the premium cable channel in January 1987. In 1997 the network was later sold to Landmark Communications, then-owner of The Weather Channel, and eventually to Paxson Communications.

Discovery Communications acquired a 70% ownership stake in the channel in 1997, and subsequently acquired the remaining 30% interest from Paxson in 1999. In May 2007, Discovery Communications sold Travel Channel to Cox Enterprises subsidiary Cox Communications as part of a larger multibillion-dollar transaction.

On November 5, 2009, Scripps Networks Interactive acquired a 65% ownership interest in the network for $1.1 billion; the deal closed in January 2010. Following the purchase, Travel Channel began to add programming from sister networks such as Food Network In 2015, Scripps relocated the channel's headquarters from Chevy Chase, Maryland to Knoxville, Tennessee.

On February 25, 2016, SNI acquired the remaining 35% stake in Travel Channel from Cox Communications, giving it full control over the network. Discovery regained ownership of the network on March 6, 2018, after acquiring SNI and headquarters removed to New York City.

Available data shows that viewership peaked in Spring 2008 at 27.78 million views per 7 days, and has been in decline ever since. As of Spring 2017, the channel got 17.25 million views.

On October 1, 2018, Travel Channel revealed a new logo stylized as Trvl Channel, and shifted its programming to focus on "the paranormal, the unsolved, the creepy and terrifying", akin to its counterpart Destination America when they drifted to paranormal programming themselves full-time in mid-2017. Certain popular shows on Travel Channel that aired on there until 2018, such as Bizarre Foods, its spinoff series Bizarre Foods Delicious Destinations, Man v. Food, Food Paradise, Hotel Impossible, and Xtreme Waterparks have shifted over to airing on either Destination America or Cooking Channel.

On January 12, 2021, it was reported that there were plans for selected Travel Channel programs to premiere exclusively on Discovery+ as timed exclusives.

Programming

Outside the United States

On March 22, 2012, Scripps Networks Interactive announced that it had agreed to pay £65 million (equivalent to US$102.7 million) to acquire Travel Channel International Limited, the UK-based broadcaster which operates across the Europe, Middle East, Africa and Asia Pacific markets, but had no direct relation to the American television channel until then. The deal was completed on May 1, 2012, following regulatory approval.

References

External links
 

Warner Bros. Discovery networks
Television networks in the United States
Television channels and stations established in 1987
English-language television stations in the United States
Travel television
Paranormal television
Former E. W. Scripps Company subsidiaries
1987 establishments in New York (state)